Daniel Joseph Kelly (September 1, 1883 – April 9, 1920) was an American long jumper and sprinter.

He attended the University of Portland's Columbia Prep high school, where 1905, he broke the existing world record for Long Jump with a jump of 22 feet, 1-1/4 inches. He later attended the University of Oregon, where in 1906, he equaled the world records in the 100 meter and 200 meter dashes in the same day. In 1908, Kelly briefly joined the Irish American Athletic Club, and competed for the United States in the 1908 Summer Olympics held in London, Great Britain in the long jump where he won the silver medal. He is a member of the University of Oregon Athletic Hall of Fame and the Oregon Sports Hall of Fame.

References

External links
Winged Fist Organization
 

1883 births
1920 deaths
American male long jumpers
American male sprinters
Olympic silver medalists for the United States in track and field
Athletes (track and field) at the 1908 Summer Olympics
Oregon Ducks men's track and field athletes
Track and field athletes from Portland, Oregon
Medalists at the 1908 Summer Olympics